The National Security and Homeland Security Presidential Directive (National Security Presidential Directive NSPD 51/Homeland Security Presidential Directive HSPD-20, sometimes called simply "Executive Directive 51" for short), signed by President of the United States George W. Bush on May 4, 2007, is a Presidential Directive establishing a comprehensive policy on the federal government structures and operations in the event of a "catastrophic emergency".  Such an emergency is defined as "any incident, regardless of location, that results in extraordinary levels of mass casualties, damage, or disruption severely affecting the U.S. population, infrastructure, environment, economy, or government functions."

The unclassified portion of the directive (which replaced President Bill Clinton's 1998 Presidential Decision Directive 67), was posted on the White House website on May 9, 2007, without any further announcement or press briefings, although Special Assistant to George W. Bush Gordon Johndroe answered several questions on the matter when asked about it by members of the press in early June 2007.

Details
This presidential directive defines the "national essential functions" of the federal government, specifies "continuity requirements" for the departments and agencies in the federal government's executive branch, and "provides guidance for state, local, territorial, and tribal governments, and private sector organizations. It also provides for a National Continuity Coordinator who will oversee the "development and implementation of federal continuity policies."

The source text indicates that during a catastrophic emergency the federal government will cooperate as a matter of comity in order to protect the constitution:

The source text for NSPD51 repeatedly reaffirms constitutionality and specifically states that "(9) Recognizing that each branch of the Federal Government is responsible for its own continuity programs, an official designated by the Chief of Staff to the President shall ensure that the executive branch's Continuity of Operations and Continuity of Government policies in support of Enduring Constitutional Government efforts are appropriately coordinated with those of the legislative and judicial branches in order to ensure interoperability and allocate national assets efficiently to maintain a functioning Federal Government."

Conservative activist Jerome Corsi and Marjorie Cohn of the National Lawyers Guild have said that this is a violation of the Constitution of the United States in that the three branches of government are separate and equal, with no single branch coordinating the others. The directive, created by the president, claims that the president has the power to declare a catastrophic emergency. It does not specify who has the power to declare the emergency over.

The directive further says that, in the case of such an emergency, the new position of "National Continuity Coordinator" would be filled by the assistant to the president for Homeland Security and Counterterrorism. (This position is currently held by Elizabeth Sherwood-Randall.) The directive also specifies that a "Continuity Policy Coordination Committee", to be chaired by a senior director of the Homeland Security Council staff, and selected by the National Continuity Coordinator, shall be "the main day-to-day forum for such policy coordination".

The directive ends by describing a number of "annexes", of which Annex A is described as being not classified but which does not appear on the directive's Web page:

(23) Annex A and the classified Continuity Annexes, attached hereto, are hereby incorporated into and made a part of this directive.

(24) Security. This directive and the information contained herein shall be protected from unauthorized disclosure, provided that, except for Annex A, the Annexes attached to this directive are classified and shall be accorded appropriate handling, consistent with applicable Executive Orders.

The "National Continuity Policy, Annex A, Categories of Departments and Agencies", available from the Financial and Banking Information Infrastructure Committee website, indicates that "executive departments and agencies are assigned to one of four categories commensurate with their COOP/COG/ECG responsibilities during an emergency".

Reception
The signing of this Directive was generally not covered by the mainstream U.S. media or discussed by the U.S. Congress. While similar executive security directives have been issued by previous presidents, with their texts kept secret, this is the first to be made public in part. It is unclear how the National Security and Homeland Security Presidential Directive will reconcile with the National Emergencies Act, a U.S. federal law passed in 1976, which gives Congress oversight over presidential emergency powers during such emergencies. The National Emergencies Act is not mentioned in the text of the National Security and Homeland Security Presidential Directive.

After receiving concerned communications from constituents, in July 2007 U.S. Representative and Homeland Security Committee member Peter DeFazio made an official request to examine the classified Continuity Annexes described above in a secure "bubbleroom" in the United States Capitol, but his request was denied by the White House, which cited "national security concerns." This was the first time DeFazio had been denied access to documents. He was quoted as saying, "We're talking about the continuity of the government of the United States of America ... I would think that would be relevant to any member of Congress, let alone a member of the Homeland Security Committee." After this denial, DeFazio joined with two colleagues (Bennie Thompson, chairman of the committee; and Chris Carney, chairman of the Homeland Security oversight subcommittee) in a renewed effort to gain access to the documents.

See also
Main Core
State of emergency
Continuity of government
Continuity of Operations Plan
Presidential directive
United States Department of Homeland Security
REX-84
Posse Comitatus Act
National Emergencies Act
State secrets privilege
Violent Radicalization and Homegrown Terrorism Prevention Act of 2007
Directive 51 (novel)
Tom Clancy's The Division

References

External links

National Security and Homeland Security Presidential Directive, from White House website
National Continuity Policy, Annex A, Categories of Departments and Agencies, from the Financial and Banking Information Infrastructure Committee website [(Web Archive)]
Boston Globe article (June 2, 2007)
U.S. Government report to Congress on National Emergency Powers (2001)[(Web Archive)], including history and development, and legislation to limit them.
Who will rule the country after the next 9/11? - Slate.com

2007 in the United States
2007 in American politics
Disaster preparedness in the United States
George W. Bush administration controversies
Federal government of the United States
Law of the United States
United States national security policy
Executive branch of the government of the United States
Emergency laws in the United States
Continuity of government in the United States
United States national security directives